Jason Mann is an American film director and screenwriter. In November 2014 it was announced that Mann had won Project Greenlight's season 4 contest and would direct The Leisure Class for HBO.

Personal life
Jason Mann grew up in San Mateo County, and attended Burlingame High School in Burlingame, California. Mann received an MFA in Film Directing from Columbia University School of the Arts and a BA in Film Production from Loyola Marymount University.

Professional life
Mann's short film Delicacy premiered at the Austin, Telluride, and Tribeca film festivals in 2012 and 2013. Another short film, The Leisure Class, premiered at the Raindance Film Festival in 2013.

In November 2014, it was announced that Mann had won, with his short film Delicacy, Project Greenlight's season 4 contest to direct a film for HBO. At the time, Mann was in his fourth-year at the Columbia University School of the Arts. Originally the contest winner was going to direct Not A Pretty Woman, a broad comedy screenplay. However, after Mann shared the script for a full-length version of a short film he had written, it was decided he would instead direct that script, The Leisure Class, a film that received universally negative reviews.

References

External links

Living people
American screenwriters
American film directors
American film producers
American cinematographers
Date of birth missing (living people)
Columbia University School of the Arts alumni
Loyola Marymount University alumni
Year of birth missing (living people)